Krivolak is a village in the municipality of Negotino, North Macedonia. It is located in the Povardarie wine-growing region, along the river Vardar. Krivolak is the place where the Battle of Krivolak between the Kingdom of Bulgaria and the French Third Republic took place during World War I.

Demographics

According to the statistics of Bulgarian ethnographer Vasil Kanchov from 1900, 725 inhabitants lived in Krivolak, 650 Muslim Bulgarians and 75 Christian Bulgarians. On the 1927 ethnic map of Leonhard Schulze-Jena, the village is shown as a fully Muslim Bulgarian village. As of the 2021 census, Krivolak had 1,163 residents with the following ethnic composition:
Macedonians 504
Roma 340
Persons for whom data are taken from administrative sources 113
Serbs 75
Others 65
Turks 52
Albanians 14

According to the 2002 census, the village had a total of 1,021 inhabitants. Ethnic groups in the village include:
Macedonians 544
Turks 28
Serbs 127
Romani 319
Albanians 1
Others 2

References

Villages in Negotino Municipality